List of Roman Catholic Churches in the Archdiocese of Atlanta. Using average weekly collections as a rough estimate of parish size.

See also
List of Catholic churches in the United States

References

External links
 Our Lady of Lourdes Catholic Church historical marker

Roman Catholic Archdiocese of Atlanta
Atlanta
Churches
Atlanta
Churces